Sri Guru Gobind Singh College of Commerce, often referred to by its initials SGGSCC, is a  constituent college of the University of Delhi located in Delhi, India.  It was founded in 1984 and is named after the tenth Sikh Guru. It is the second college of commerce of the University of Delhi and is primarily a co-educational English medium institution. In the year 2022, the National Assessment and Accreditation Council accredited it with a CGPA of 3.54 and a A++ grade. It is also ranked 63rd among colleges across India by National Institutional Ranking Framework in 2022.

The university runs undergraduate and post-graduate degrees in commerce fields. One of its flagship programmes is its B.A.(Honours) Business Economics programme.

As of the latest records, the college has a total student strength of about 2200 and teaching faculty comprising 70 teachers. The Principal is Dr J. B. Singh and the staff are almost exclusively Delhi University graduates themselves.

History 
Sri Guru Gobind Singh College of Commerce was founded in 1984 as the second Commerce College of the University of Delhi. Strategically located near the Pitampura TV Tower, the college is managed by Delhi Sikh Gurdwara Management Committee, a statutory body, constituted under an Act of Parliament. The college is named after the tenth Guru Sri Guru Gobind Singh Ji.

College Principals
Dr. S.S. Gulshan                  (1984-1987)
Prof. Jaswant Singh Phul          (1987-2000)
Dr. Jaspal Singh                  (2001-2008)

Courses and departments 
The institute offers courses in the commerce and economics streams. The graduate programs offered are:
 Bachelor of Commerce with Honours. 
 Bachelor of Arts with Honours in Economics. 
 Bachelor of Commerce. 
 Bachelor of Science with honours in Computer Science
 Diploma in Business Journalism and Corporate Communication. or (D.B.J.C.C)
 Post Graduate Diploma in International Marketing. or (P.G.D.I.M) 
 Bachelor of Arts with Honours in Business Economics. or (B.B.E.) 
 Bachelor in Management Studies. or (B.M.S.)

BMS is the newest among courses offered by the college, having been rolled out in 2017-18

Add-on courses
 Certificate course in French Language
 Certificate course in German Language
 Foundation Course in Banking
 Short term course in tally Accounting Practices
 Integrated program in  currency, commodities and derivatives.
 Financial modelling.

College rankings
As per India Today - Nielsen 2016 College Rankings for Commerce courses, SGGSCC came in at rank 19 in a survey that consisted of more than 100 top colleges of India. It also stands 8th in Delhi University for all courses as per Nielson survey 2016.
"DUADMISSIONS.CO" has ranked the college 5th for commerce courses.

It is ranked 71st among colleges across India by National Institutional Ranking Framework in 2020.

Campus 
The college, spread over ~, possesses infrastructure including class-rooms, grounds, a library and computer labs. The college is linked to Delhi University through Intranet and shares all electronic resources. The college also possesses a fully air-conditioned 500-seat auditorium. Most importantly, The college also has a national level lawn tennis ground, a cricket ground and a well equipped gymnasium named after Sahibzada Jujhar Singh ji.
The campus also houses the girls hostel in the name of Mata Sahib Kaur Ji.

Societies

The college consists of numerous societies.
These include:

 Folking Desi - The Bhangra Society
 Fashion Society - IVogue  
 Finance society - Finance and Investment Cell
 Chess Society - Check Bouncers
Economics  Society - The Arthashastra Society.
Dramatics Society - Manchtantra.
The Film and Photography Society - Invictus.
The International Cell
Quizzing Society - Quest.
Rotaract Club.
English Literary Society - Meraki.
Debating Society - Cross Swords.
The Commerce Department - Urja.

Computer Science Society - ACE (Association of Computer Enthusiasts)
Business Economics and Management Studies Society - A.S.B.E.M.S(Association of Students of Business Economics and Management Studies) 
Punjabi  Sahitya  Sabha.
Divinity  Society.
National  Service  Scheme.
Music Society - Surveen.
Dance Society - Misba.
Sports Academy.
Enactus SGGSCC.
The Entrepreneurship Development Cell.
Equal Opportunity Cell.
Political Science society-Loktantra

Placement
The college has set up a placement cell in January 2005 to institutionalize the process of summer training and final placements of students from BBE, B.Sc.(Hons.) Computer Science, B.Com(pass), B.Com(Hons.), Economic(Hons.). About Post Graduate Courses: Post Graduate Diploma in International Marketing (PGDIM) and Diploma in Business Journalism And Corporate Communication (DBJCC) have got 100% placement result. Some of the organizations where the students have been placed are as follows:

RBS
Dell Computers
Genpact
C-Vent
JWT
Propel PR
OMAXE
EVEREST
IPAN
Creative News
American Express
KPMG
E&Y
Deloitte
Airtel
Wipro

References

External links
Sri Guru Gobind Singh College Of Commerce

Delhi University
Commerce colleges in India
North Delhi district
1984 establishments in Delhi
Memorials to Guru Gobind Singh
Educational institutions established in 1984